Yekaterina Mukhina (1944-1996) was a Soviet-Russian Politician (Communist).

She was a member of the Presidium of the Supreme Soviet, making her a member of the Collective Head of State, in 1979-1984.

References

1944 births
20th-century Russian women politicians
20th-century Russian politicians
Russian communists
Soviet women in politics
Presidium of the Supreme Soviet